Wilhelm Johann Karl Zahn (21 August 1800 in Rodenberg, Schaumburg – 22 August 1871 in Berlin) was a German architect, painter, art critic and design researcher particularly of Roman interior designs found in the ruins of Pompeii. Wilhelm was born as the fourth of five children of painter Bernhard Zahn, and his wife, Christiane, née Weis according to church records. He attended high schools in Bückeburg and Rinteln where he received a universal education. It was in Rinteln where Zahn studied the classics under a Professor Stein who Zahn remembered with particular affection.

Professional Development
Zahn received lessons in architecture and painting from Andreas Range and Sebastian Weygandt, a portrait painter, in Kassel, Germany. He also studied under German neoclassical architect and garden designer, Heinrich Christoph Jussow. Around 1823/24, while he was in Paris with his brother Georg and Johann Wilhelm Nahl, he attended the studios of Jean-Victor Bertin, a French landscape painter, and Antoine-Jean Gros, a French neoclassical artist known for his historical paintings completed under the patronage of Napoleon Bonaparte.
 
Following Zahn's stay in Paris, beginning in 1824, he spent three years in Italy, particularly in Pompeii, where he made numerous tracings of wall frescoes in the ruins and in the Museo Borbonico (now the National Archaeological Museum, Naples). He superintended excavations at Herculaneum and Pompeii; cast the finest bronzes and silver vases for the Museum Borbonico; After Zahn's return from Italy in 1827, he met celebrated poet and naturalist Johann Wolfgang von Goethe. Together with the Grand Duke of Weimar, Goethe introduced Zahn to then Crown Prince, later King Friedrich Wilhelm IV, the Humboldt brothers, Prince Wittgenstein, Schinkel and the sculptor Rauch, as well as other art lovers who promoted the publication of Zahn's drawings from Pompeii.  In 1829, Zahn became professor in the Prussian Academy of Arts in Berlin.  As an architect and interior designer, he decorated many fine houses and villas in the Pompeiian style in England and the United States.

Works
Zahn's portfolio “The most beautiful ornaments and strangest paintings from Pompeii, Herculanum and Stabiae” published by Verlag Reimer between 1828 and 1830 with 100 plates, many of them printed in color using an improved process in color lithography Zahn invented in 1818. He later continued the successful publication with two more volumes of the same size. In addition, he brought out epoch-spanning model works with ornaments. The focus of his research interest was to obtain templates for arts and crafts. However, with increasing scientific research into antiquity and other art epochs, less importance was attached to his publications.

 The Most Beautiful Ornaments and the Most Notable Pictures from Pompeii, Herculaneum and Stabiæ (1828–30)
 Ornaments of All Classical Periods of Art based on the originals in their peculiar colors  (1832–48) Reimer, Berlin, 20 volumes with 100 plates.
 The most beautiful ornaments and curious paintings from Pompeii, Herculanum and Stabiae, from the original drawings made on the spot 2nd episode. Reimer, Berlin (1842–1844).
 The most beautiful ornaments and most remarkable paintings from Pompeii, Herculanum and Stabiae from the original drawings made on the spot 3rd episode. Reimer, Berlin (1852-1859)
 Exquisite ornaments from the entire field of fine arts Reimer, Berlin (1842-1844); 5 volumes with 25 plates.
 2nd edition 1853
 3rd edition 1870 (Internet Archive)

Sampling of reproductions of Frescos and Mosaics from Pompeii and Herculaneum by Wilhelm Zahn

Notes

References
 
 
 Max Schasler: Studies on the characteristics of important contemporary artists, XXXII "Wilhelm Zahn". In: Schasler's Ztschr. "The Dioscuri". 8th year, no. 28–35, 1863, pp. 209–210, 217-219, 225-227, 233-235, 241-243, 249-250, 255-256, 261-262
 Joachim Migl: The pictures in print. Techniques and Importance. In: Marion Mannsperger, Joachim Migl (eds.): Pictures from Pompeii. Second hand antiquity. Traces in Württemberg (exhibition catalog Stuttgart 1998). 1998, p. 27-40.
 Joachim Migl: Wilhelm Zahn's documentation of Pompeian wall paintings as an early color lithograph (with an excursus on technology by Boris Fuchs Scientific aspects). In: Volker Benad-Wagenhoff, Silvia Werfel (ed.): Printing ink between alchemy and high-tech. Annual conference of the International Working Group on Printing History (IAD), November 9 to 11, 2001 in Stuttgart (= contributions to the history of printing). tape 2, 2003, p. 39-60.
 Sylva van der Heyden: Zahn, Wilhelm. In: Bénédicte Savoy, France Nerlich (ed.): Paris apprenticeship. A lexicon of the training of German painters in the French capital. tape 1: 1793–1843. De Gruyter, Berlin/Boston 2013, p. 322-323.
 Arnd Hennemeyer: Wilhelm Zahn's Pompeii publication. An Incunabula of Color Lithography. In: Uta Hassler (ed.): Painting technique & colorants of the Semper period. Hirmer, Munich 2014, p. 98-123.
 María Ocón Fernández: Wilhelm Zahn's work on the wall paintings of Pompeii. Relationship between original, document and copy. In: Uta Hassler (ed.): Polychromy & Knowledge. Hirmer, Munich 2019, pp. 76–97.

External links
 
 Letter from Johann Wolfgang Goethe to Wilhelm Johann Carl Zahn, Weimar, March 10, 1832. on zeno.org
 Wilhelm Zahn's diary about his first meeting with Goethe (pdf in German)

1800 births
1871 deaths
19th-century German painters
19th-century German male artists
German male painters
German art critics
19th-century German journalists
Male journalists
19th-century German architects
19th-century German male writers